Ana Isabel Allende Cano (born 29 June 1963) is a Mexican politician affiliated with the PRI. She currently serves as Deputy of the LXII Legislature of the Mexican Congress representing Puebla.

References

1963 births
Living people
Politicians from Puebla
Women members of the Chamber of Deputies (Mexico)
Institutional Revolutionary Party politicians
21st-century Mexican politicians
21st-century Mexican women politicians
Universidad Iberoamericana alumni
Meritorious Autonomous University of Puebla alumni
Deputies of the LXII Legislature of Mexico
Members of the Chamber of Deputies (Mexico) for Puebla